Limited animation is a process in the overall technique of traditional animation that reuses frames of character animation.

Early history
The use of budget-cutting and time-saving animation measures in animation dates back to the earliest commercial animation, including cycled animations, mirror-image and symmetrical drawings, still characters, and other labor-saving methods. In general, the progression was from early productions in which every frame was drawn by hand, independent of each other drawing, toward more limited animation that made use of the same drawings in different ways. 

Winsor McCay, a man who put an unprecedented amount of detail into his animations, boasted that in his 1914 film, Gertie the Dinosaur, everything moved, including the rocks and blades of grass in the background. In contrast, his 1918 film The Sinking of the Lusitania progressed to using cels over still backgrounds, while still maintaining a level of detail comparable to that of Gertie. 

The 1942 Merrie Melodies cartoon The Dover Boys, directed by Chuck Jones, is one of the earliest Warner Bros. cartoons to extensively employ some of the processes of what would become known as "limited animation," particularly its use of characters that either stand still or move so quickly that the actual motion appears to be a blur. This animation technique has come to be known as the smear frame.

American television

Hanna-Barbera Productions used limited animation throughout its existence. When the company's namesakes, William Hanna and Joseph Barbera, separated from the MGM studio in 1957, they opted to take a drastically different approach to animation than they had for their fully animated short films; as television screens were much smaller than theater screens at the time, limited animation, with its emphasis on character close-ups and dialogue-based humor, was a better fit for the more intimate home viewer experience. At the time, most feature films (along with animated shorts, including Hanna and Barbera's own work on Tom and Jerry) were transitioning to the widescreen CinemaScope process, which made it more difficult to replicate intimacy; The Walt Disney Company, though they continued to use full animation, had also used character close-ups and personality-driven humor in their early films. When Disney produced Lady and the Tramp in CinemaScope, the process made it difficult to replicate that style, a problem that Hanna-Barbera did not have with smaller, more square television screens.

The financial benefits of limited animation led to television animation companies relying on the process extensively in the television era. Jay Ward Productions relied on limited animation for those reasons, compensating with its heavy Cold War satire and a style of deadpan comedy that would become a trademark of the studio's style.  One of the frequent users of limited animation was HB's Saturday-morning rival Filmation (makers of He-Man and the Masters of the Universe and BraveStarr) which gave their work a distinct look. Bill Melendez used a form of limited animation to adapt the Peanuts franchise to television and later film; in addition to the cost and time concerns (especially for his first special A Charlie Brown Christmas, which was given only a $76,000 budget and four months to produce 30 minutes of animation), Meléndez also noted that Peanuts creator Charles M. Schulz had designed the characters with a flat style well-suited for limited animation. The short-lived Cambria Studios turned out three serials (including Clutch Cargo) using one of the most inexpensive approaches to animation possible: known as Syncro-Vox, it involved superimposing film of the voice actor's moving lips over a still frame of the character. Disney themselves resorted to some limited animation tricks in an effort to cut its budget during the 1960s, particularly with its usage of xerography in One Hundred and One Dalmatians, which resulted in artwork with heavier, rougher outlines than had previously been seen in Disney films up to that point. 

By the 1970s, the usage of limited animation in Saturday morning cartoons had become an epidemic; Walter Williams, creator of The Mr. Bill Show, noted that cartoons in the 1970s were so static, he expected the artist's hands to enter the screen at any moment and physically start moving the drawings around. This inspired him to create the "Mr. Hands" character in The Mr. Bill Show, who literally did just that.

Japanese television

Limited animation proved to be particularly popular in Japan, such that the Japanese word for animation, anime, entered the English lexicon as a loanword for the distinctive style of Japanese animation that took root there.  Anime features scenes of mouth moving with occasional eye blinks, rendered long shots of detailed backgrounds, a low frame rate (especially in earlier productions) and rare use of 2D fluidity on motion-blur filled action alongside reused drawings, using style conventions from Japanese comic books (manga). It also has the benefit of lower cost productions and stylized content as opposed to realistic animation. As was the case in the United States, television was a major impetus for the growth of anime in Japan; the country's recovery from World War II led to economic prosperity and a boom in Japanese television ownership, and the development of anime allowed Japan to compete in an animation field where they had previously lagged well behind the West.

See also 

 Cutout animation
 Flash animation
 Motion comic
 PowerPoint animation
 Squigglevision
 Stock footage
 UPA (animation studio)
 Adult Swim

References 

Animation techniques